The Ghana men's national field hockey team represents Ghana in men's international field hockey competitions and is controlled by the Ghana Hockey Association, the governing body for field hockey in Ghana.

Ghana is ranked at 36 according to FIH Rankings (as of June 2019). Ghana participated in the Hockey World League for the first time in 2016–2017.  In Round 1, they played in the African group with Kenya, Namibia and Nigeria, winning all three pool matches including a 1-0 victory over the strong Kenyan team. In Round 2, they were placed in Pool B with Sri Lanka, Egypt and China. Ghana beat only Sri Lanka, and in the quarterfinal clash, Oman stunned Ghana 4-3. In the end, Ghana finished 6th in the rankings.

Trainings and matches in preparation for international tournaments are held at the Theodosia Okoh Hockey Stadium in Accra.

Tournament record

World Cup
 1975 – 12th place

Africa Cup of Nations
 1974 – 
 1983 – 
 2000 – 4th place
 2005 – 
 2009 – 
 2013 – 4th place
 2017 – 
 2022 – 5th

African Games
 1987 – 5th place
 1991 – 4th place
 1999 – 5th place
 2003 – 
 2023 - Qualified

African Olympic Qualifier
 2007 – 4th place
 2011 – 
 2015 – 4th place
 2019 –

Commonwealth Games
 2022 – 10th place

Hockey World League
 2012–13 – Round 1
 2014–15 – Round 1
 2016–17 – 28th place

See also
Ghana women's national field hockey team

References

External links
FIH profile

African men's national field hockey teams
Field hockey
National team